96 Bitter Beings is an American rock band from Los Angeles, formed in 2016 by vocalist and guitarist Deron Miller (original founder and frontman of West Chester rock band CKY, with whom he parted ways with in 2011). 96 Bitter Beings carries on Miller's signature songwriting with lead guitarist Kenneth Hunter, bassist Matthew Janaitis and drummer Tuomas Vuorio.

The group came together in 2014 to record a 20th anniversary album for Foreign Objects - a sci-fi death metal band formed by Miller and Jess Margera in 1995 pre CKY. After a string of live performances throughout 2015 as Foreign Objects, the newly formed lineup ran an Indiegogo campaign to fund the formation of 96 Bitter Beings in 2016. Through crowdfunding, they released their first album titled Camp Pain in 2018 along with multiple perk tracks that have since been made public by the contributors.

Former Jackass star Chris Raab works closely with the band producing and directing music videos, the first of which for "On and On and On" from their album Camp Pain.

In January and February 2020, the band headlined a North American tour through the United States and Canada with supporting acts The Native Howl and Locust Grove.

The band's second album, Synergy Restored, was confirmed by Miller to be complete and pending an official release date, with one music video confirmed to be completed by Raab for "Vaudeville's Revenge". In July 2022, the music video for "Vaudeville's Revenge" was released, and the band also announced Synergy Restored would be released on November 4. During the band’s 2022 of America, Tim Luera abruptly left the band hours before a live show was to take place, followed shortly by his brother Shaun. Miller was able to have fellow former CKY member Matthew Janaitis fly from Finland in order to play drums for the remainder of the tour. Miller has stated that the Luera brothers have not reached out to him with any form of explanation and will not be rejoining the band. On October 24 Deron announced that Janaitis and Tuomas Vuorio had joined the band on bass and drums respectively. Synergy Restored was released as scheduled on compact disc and vinyl, as well as digitally, on November 4, 2022.

Members
Current members
Deron Miller – vocals, guitar (2016–present)
Kenneth Hunter – lead guitar (2016–present)
Matthew Janaitis – bass (2022–present), drums (live only; 2022)
Tuomas Vuorio - drums (2022-present)
Former members
Shaun Luera – bass (2016–2022)
Tim Luera – drums (2016–2022)

Discography
Camp Pain (2018)
Synergy Restored (2022)

References

American alternative metal musical groups